Bennett Flowers (June 15, 1927 – February 18, 2009) was an American professional baseball pitcher who played in Major League Baseball for four teams between  and . He was a native of Goldsboro, North Carolina.

Then, during  and 1956, he worked in 43 total games for three MLB teams: the Detroit Tigers (1955), St. Louis Cardinals (1955–1956) and Philadelphia Phillies (1956). His most productive season came for the 1953 Red Sox, when he posted career-bests in earned run average (ERA) (3.86), strikeouts (36), and innings pitched (87), in 32 games, including six starts, and one shutout, while recording all three of his career saves. His lone big-league shutout and complete game happened on August 5, when he blanked the St. Louis Browns, 5–0, at Fenway Park, allowing eight hits and two bases on balls. The losing pitcher in that contest was Don Larsen, later to be immortalized as a New York Yankee by his perfect game during the 1956 World Series.

Over all or parts of four MLB seasons, Flowers posted a career 3–7 won–lost record, with a 4.49 ERA and three saves in 76 games, including 13 starts. He recorded one shutout and 31 games finished. In 168 innings of work, he allowed 190 hits and 54 bases on balls, with 86 strikeouts. His entire pro career lasted for 15 years (1945–1946; 1948–1960).

References

External links

Ben Flowers at SABR (Baseball BioProject)
Ben Flowers at Pura Pelota (Venezuelan Professional Baseball League)

1927 births
2009 deaths
Baltimore Orioles (IL) players
Baseball players from North Carolina
Birmingham Barons players
Boston Red Sox players
Buffalo Bisons (minor league) players
Denver Bears players
Detroit Tigers players
Los Angeles Angels (minor league) players
Louisville Colonels (minor league) players
Major League Baseball pitchers
Patriotas de Venezuela players
People from Goldsboro, North Carolina
People from Wilson, North Carolina
Philadelphia Phillies players
Richmond Virginians (minor league) players
Roanoke Red Sox players
St. Louis Cardinals players
San Diego Padres (minor league) players
Scranton Red Sox players
Wilson Tobs players